F27 or F-27 may refer to:
 F-27 Sport Cruiser, a trimaran sailboat design
 Fokker F27 Friendship, a 1955 Dutch turboprop airliner
Fairchild F-27, a 1958 American variant of the turboprop airliner
 HMS Lynx (F27), a 1955 British Royal Navy Leopard-class Type 41 anti aircraft frigate
 Fluorine-27 (F-27 or 27F), an isotope of fluorine